São Pedro is a municipality in the state of São Paulo in Brazil.

Geography

Climate
According to the Köppen climate classification São Pedro has a tropical savanna climate.

Parks and recreation

Infrastructure

Transportation 

The city is served by São Pedro Airport.

Utilities 

Water is provided by the Autonomous Service of Water and Sewage of São Pedro (SAAESP).

References

External links

  Prefeitura de São Pedro The official website of São Pedro.
  Câmara Municipal de São Pedro São Pedro City Council website.
  Estância Turística de São Pedro A tourism website about São Pedro.

Municipalities in São Paulo (state)